The 2011 CIS football season began on September 1, 2011, with the Montreal Carabins hosting the McGill Redmen at CEPSUM Stadium. The season concluded on November 25 at BC Place Stadium in Vancouver, British Columbia with the 47th Vanier Cup championship. This year, 26 university teams in Canada played CIS football, the highest level of amateur Canadian football.

Regular season standings

Top 10
{|class="wikitable sortable"
|+ FRC-CIS top 10 rankings
|-
! scope="col" |  
! scope="col" | 01
! scope="col" | 02
! scope="col" | 03
! scope="col" | 04
! scope="col" | 05
! scope="col" | 06
! scope="col" | 07
! scope="col" | 08
! scope="col" | 09
! scope="col" | 10
|-
! scope="row" | Acadia Axemen
| 12 || NR || 14 || 12 || 14 || 12 || 12 || 12 || 9 || 9 
|-
! scope="row" | Alberta Golden Bears
| NR || NR || NR || NR || NR || NR || NR || NR || NR || NR 
|-
! scope="row" | Bishop's Gaiters
| NR || NR || NR || NR || NR || NR || NR || NR || NR || NR 
|-
! scope="row" | Calgary Dinos
| 4 || 4 || 3 || 3 || 3 || 3 || 2 || 2 || 1 || 2 
|-
! scope="row" | Concordia Stingers
| 11 || 12 || 12 || 14 || 13 || 13 || 14 || NR || NR || NR 
|-
! scope="row" | Guelph Gryphons
| 15 || NR || NR || NR || NR || NR || NR || NR || NR || NR 
|-
! scope="row" | Laurier Golden Hawks
| 10 || 8 || 13 || NR || 15 || 11 || 13 || 13 || NR || NR 
|-
! scope="row" | Laval Rouge et Or
| 1 || 1 || 1 || 1 || 1 || 1 || 3 || 3 || 2 || 1 
|-
! scope="row" | Manitoba Bisons
| NR || 14 || 15 || 10 || 12 || NR || NR || NR || NR || NR 
|-
! scope="row" | McGill Redmen
| NR || NR || NR || NR || NR || NR || NR || NR || NR || NR 
|-
! scope="row" | McMaster Marauders
| 3 || 3 || 7 || 6 || 6 || 5 || 6 || 5 || 3 || 4 
|-
! scope="row" | Montreal Carabins
| 7 || 6 || 6 || 4 || 4 || 6 || 5 || 6 || 5 || 7 
|-
! scope="row" | Mount Allison Mounties
| NR || NR || NR || NR || NR || NR || NR || NR || NR || NR 
|-
! scope="row" | Ottawa Gee-Gees
| 13 || 11 || 9 || 13 || 10 || NR || 10 || 9 || 12 || NR 
|-
! scope="row" | Queen's Golden Gaels
| 14 || NR || NR || 16 || NR || 14 || 11 || 11 || 8 || 8 
|-
! scope="row" | Regina Rams
| 6 || 13 || NR || NR || NR || NR || NR || NR || NR || NR 
|-
! scope="row" | Saint Mary's Huskies
| 9 || 9 || 8 || 8 || 7 || 8 || 8 || 7 || 11 || 12 
|-
! scope="row" | Saskatchewan Huskies
| 5 || 5 || 4 || 7 || 9 || 7 || 7 || 10 || 10 || 10 
|-
! scope="row" | Sherbrooke Vert et Or
| 8 || 7 || 5 || 5 || 5 || 4 || 4 || 4 || 6 || 5 
|-
! scope="row" | St. Francis Xavier X-Men
| NR || NR || NR || NR || NR || NR || NR || NR || NR || NR 
|-
! scope="row" | Toronto Varsity Blues
| NR || NR || NR || 15 || NR || NR || NR || NR || NR || NR 
|-
! scope="row" | UBC Thunderbirds
| 16 || 10 || 11 || 9 || 8 || 9 || 9 || 8 || 7 || 6 
|-
! scope="row" | Western Mustangs
| 2 || 2 || 2 || 2 || 2 || 2 || 1 || 1 || 4 || 3 
|-
! scope="row" | Windsor Lancers
| NR || NR || 10 || 11 || 11 || 10 || NR || NR || 13 || 11 
|-
! scope="row" | York Lions
| NR || NR || NR || NR || NR || NR || NR || NR || NR || NR 
|
|}
Ranks in italics'' are teams not ranked in the top 10 poll but received votes.
NR = Not Ranked, received no votes.

Championships 
The Vanier Cup is played between the champions of the Mitchell Bowl and the Uteck Bowl, the national semi-final games. In 2011, according to the rotating schedule, the Atlantic conference Loney Bowl champions will meet the Ontario conference's Yates Cup champion for the Uteck Bowl. The winners of the Canada West conference Hardy Trophy will host the Dunsmore Cup Quebec championship team for the Mitchell Bowl.

Playoff bracket

Post-season awards

All-Canadian team 

 First team 
Offence
 Billy Greene, QB, UBC
 Steven Lumbala, RB, Calgary
 Anthony Coombs, RB, Manitoba
 Simon Charbonneau-Campeau, WR, Sherbrooke
 Michael DiCroce, WR, McMaster
 Jordan Brescacin, IR, Windsor
 Michael Squires, IR, Acadia
 Pierre Lavertu, C, Laval
 Kirby Fabien, OT, Calgary
 Brendan Dunn, OT, Western Ontario
 Matthew Norman, G, Western Ontario
 Brett Jones, G, Regina
Defence
 Stefan Charles, DT, Regina
 Seamus Postuma, DT, Windsor
 Akiem Hicks, DE, Regina
 Arnaud Gascon-Nadon, DE, Laval
 Max Caron, LB, Concordia
 Samuel Hurl, LB, Calgary
 Kevin Régimbald Gagné, LB, Sherbrooke
 Teague Sherman, FS, Manitoba
 Cameron Wade, HB, Acadia
 Beau Landry, HB, Western Ontario
 Dominic Noël, CB, Laval
 Kayin Marchand-Wright, CB, Saint Mary's
Special teams
 Chris Bodnar, P, Regina
 Tyler Crapigna, K, McMaster
 Kris Robertson, RET, Concordia
 Second team 
Offence
 Kyle Quinlan, QB, McMaster
 Ryan Granberg, RB, Queen's
 Sébastien Lévesque, RB, Laval
 Dustin Zender, WR, Waterloo
 Jordan Grieve, WR, UBC
 Dillon Heap, IR, Wilfrid Laurier
 Alexander Fox, IR, Bishop's
 Quinn McCaughan, C, Calgary
 Matthew Sewell, OT, McMaster
 Ben Heenan, OT, Saskatchewan
 Jason Medeiros, G, McMaster
 Reed Alexander, G, Calgary
Defence
 Linden Gaydosh, DT, Calgary
 Jake Thomas, DT, Acadia
 Jonathan Pierre-Etienne, DE, Montreal
 Rob Jubenville, DE, Saint Mary's
 Jordan Verdone, LB, Calgary
 Jonathan Beaulieu-Richard, LB, Montreal
 Sam Sabourin, LB, Queen's
 Jonathan Laliberté, FS, Laval
 Matt McGarva, HB, Windsor
 Patrick Chénard, HB, Sherbrooke
 Sam Carino, CB, UBC
 Andrew Lue, CB, Queen's
Special teams
 Darryl Wheeler, P, Western Ontario
 Johnny Mark, K, Calgary
 Nic Demski, RET, Manitoba

Teams

References

Cis
U Sports football seasons